In 2005, three major fires occurred in Paris, France, killing 48 people. 

In the early hours of 15 April 2005, a fire broke out at the Paris-Opera - a six-storey, one-star, budget hotel in the 9th arrondissement. Most of the 76 people staying in the hotel at the time were African immigrants waiting to be housed. The rest were guests of several different nationalities. 24 people were killed and 50 others injured.

On 26 August 2005, 17 West African immigrants were killed in a fire at a block of flats in the 13th arrondissement.

On 30 August 2005, 7 Ivorian immigrants were killed in a fire at a block of flats in the Marais.

References

2005 disasters in France
Fires
2005 fires in Europe
April 2005 events in France
August 2005 events in France
Building and structure fires in France
2005
Hotel fires
Residential building fires